Gymnanthenea is a genus of sea stars in the family Oreasteridae.

Selected species
 Gymnanthenea globigera (Döderlein, 1915)
 Gymnanthenea laevis H.L.Clark, 1938
 List source:

References

Oreasteridae
Taxa named by Hubert Lyman Clark